Antimachia was a town of ancient Greece on the island of Cos. Antimachia was the capital of the demoi of Aegelus and Archia.

Its site is located near modern Antimakheia.

References

Populated places in the ancient Aegean islands
Former populated places in Greece
Kos